This is a list of Superfund sites in the United States Virgin Islands designated under the Comprehensive Environmental Response, Compensation, and Liability Act (CERCLA) environmental law:

See also
List of Superfund sites in the United States
List of environmental issues
List of waste types
TOXMAP

References

External links
EPA list of current Superfund sites in the United States Virgin Islands
EPA list of deleted Superfund sites in the United States Virgin Islands

Virgin Islands
Environment of the United States Virgin Islands
Superfund